Money Madness is a 1917 American silent crime drama film directed by Henry MacRae and starring Charles Hill Mailes, Gayne Whitman and Mary MacLaren.

Cast
 Charles Hill Mailes as Whispering Smith 
 Don Bailey as George Fuller
 Gayne Whitman as Tom Williams 
 Mary MacLaren as Ethel Fuller
 Rex De Rosselli as Dr. Mercer
 Eddie Polo as 'Harford' Red
 M. Everett as Monroe Simmons

References

Bibliography
 Robert B. Connelly. The Silents: Silent Feature Films, 1910-36, Volume 40, Issue 2. December Press, 1998.

External links
 

1917 films
1917 drama films
1910s English-language films
American silent feature films
Silent American drama films
American black-and-white films
Universal Pictures films
Films directed by Henry MacRae
1910s American films